Lachie Plowman (born 11 September 1994) is an Australian rules footballer who plays for the Carlton Football Club in the Australian Football League (AFL). 

Plowman originated in the Macedon Ranges from Sacred Heart College, Kyneton. In 2011 and 2012 he played in the TAC Cup for the Calder Cannons, playing primarily as a tall defender.

He made his AFL debut in the opening round of the 2013 season. He played eighteen games for Greater Western Sydney over the first two years of his career, winning a regular place in the team in the latter part of 2014. An elbow injury limited him to only two senior games in 2015.

In October 2015, Plowman and three other Giants teammates (Jed Lamb, Andrew Phillips and Liam Sumner) were traded to the Carlton Football Club. He immediately became a regular member of Carlton's best 22, playing 40 of a possible 44 games during his first two years at the Blues.  At the end of 2017 he signed another 2 year deal with Carlton.

Statistics
Statistics are correct to the end of round 1, 2020

|- style="background-color: #EAEAEA"
! scope="row" style="text-align:center" | 2013
|
| 30 || 6 || 1 || 1 || 35 || 21 || 56 || 16 || 6 || 0.2 || 0.2 || 5.8 || 3.5 || 9.3 || 2.7 || 1
|-
! scope="row" style="text-align:center" |2014
|Greater Western Sydney
|| 30 || 12 || 0 || 3 || 67 || 47 || 114 || 38 || 29 || 0.0 || 0.3 || 5.6 || 3.9 || 9.5 || 3.2 || 2.4
|- style="background-color: #EAEAEA"
! scope="row" style="text-align:center" |2015
|Greater Western Sydney
| 30 || 2 || 0 || 0 || 11 || 25 || 36 || 5 || 4 || 0.0 || 0.0 || 5.5 || 12.5 || 18.0 || 2.5 || 2.0
|-
! scope="row" style="text-align:center" |2016
|Carlton
| 20 || 19 || 0 || 0 || 121 || 112 || 233 || 77 || 35 || 0 || 0 || 6.4 || 5.9 || 12.3 || 4.1 || 1.8
|- style="background-color: #EAEAEA"
! scope="row" style="text-align:center" |2017
|Carlton
| 20 || 21 || 0 || 1 || 178 || 123 || 301 || 111 || 42 || 0.0 || 0.0 || 8.5 || 5.9 || 14.3 || 5.3 || 2.0
|-
! scope="row" style="text-align:center" |2018
|Carlton
| 20 || 13 || 0 || 0 || 98 || 57 || 155 || 57 || 17 || 0.0 || 0.0 || 7.5 || 4.4 || 11.9 || 4.4 || 1.3
|- style="background-color: #EAEAEA"
! scope="row" style="text-align:center" |2019
|Carlton
| 20 || 21 || 0 || 0 || 220 || 85 || 305 || 96 || 48 || 0.0 || 0.0 || 10.5 || 4.0 || 14.5 || 4.6 || 2.3
|-
! scope="row" style="text-align:center" |2020
|Carlton
| 20 || 1 || 0 || 1 || 5 || 2 || 7 || 1 || 0 || 0.0 || 1.0 || 5.0 || 2.0 || 7.0 || 1.0 || 0.0
|- class="sortbottom"
! colspan=3| Career
! 95
! 1
! 6
! 735
! 472
! 1207
! 401
! 181
! 0.0
! 0.1
! 7.7
! 5.0
! 12.7
! 4.2
! 1.9
|}

References

External links

Living people
1994 births
Australian rules footballers from Victoria (Australia)
Carlton Football Club players
Greater Western Sydney Giants players
Calder Cannons players
Preston Football Club (VFA) players